Erik Riska (born 16 May 1989) is a Finnish ice hockey forward currently playing for Vaasan Sport of the Finnish Liiga.

References

External links
 

1989 births
Living people
Vaasan Sport players
Finnish ice hockey forwards
Lukko players
People from Jakobstad
Sportspeople from Ostrobothnia (region)